HFZ Capital Group is a real estate development and investment company based in New York City. Ziel Feldman founded HFZ in 2005 and serves as chairman. As of 2019, HFZ manages more than $10 billion worth of development.

History
Prior to launching HFZ in 2005, Feldman was principal at the national development firm Property Markets Group (PMG), which he co-founded with Kevin Maloney in 1991. At PMG, Feldman also worked with Gary Barnett of Extell Development Company.

In 2013, HFZ and partner Fortress Investment Group purchased four Manhattan rental buildings, including The Astor, from Westbrook Partners for more than $610 million. HFZ then converted the properties into for-sale condominiums.

In March 2015, HFZ acquired The Belnord on the Upper West Side of Manhattan from Extell for about $575 million. HFZ hired architect Robert A. M. Stern for the renovation and conversion of the pre-war building into a condominium.

In May 2015, HFZ acquired a full-block site in Chelsea, Manhattan between 17th and 18th Street, and 10th and 11th Avenue for $870 million from Edison Properties. HFZ is developing the property into a two-tower mixed-use development called The XI. Designed by architect Bjarke Ingels, The XI will house 236 condos and Six Senses first hotel in the U.S.

References

External links
 

Companies based in Manhattan
Real estate companies of the United States
American companies established in 2005
2005 establishments in New York City